The men's field hockey tournament at the 2016 Summer Olympics was the 23rd edition of the field hockey event for men at the Summer Olympics. It took place over a thirteen-day period beginning on 6 August, and culminated with the medal finals on 18 August. All games were played at the Olympic Hockey Centre in Deodoro, Rio de Janeiro, Brazil.

Argentina won the gold medal for the first time after defeating Belgium 4–2 in the final. Defending champions Germany won the bronze medal by defeating the Netherlands 4–3 on a penalty shoot-out after a 1–1 draw.

The medals for the tournament were presented by Rene Fasel, Switzerland; Pierre-Olivier Beckers-Vieujant, Belgium; and Gerardo Werthein, Argentina; members of the International Olympic Committee, and the gifts were presented by Coco Budeisky and Marc Coudron, executive board members of the International Hockey Federation and Leandro Negre, president of the International Hockey Federation.

Competition schedule
The match schedule of the men's tournament was unveiled on 27 April 2016.

Competition format
The twelve teams in the tournament were divided into two groups of six, with each team initially playing round-robin games within their group. Following the completion of the round-robin stage, the top four teams from each group advance to the quarter-finals. The two semi-final winners meet for the gold medal match, while the semi-final losers play in the bronze medal match.

Qualification

Each of the Continental Champions from five confederations received an automatic berth. Brazil as the host nation qualified automatically but with a rider. Due to the standard of field hockey in Brazil, the International Hockey Federation (FIH) and the International Olympic Committee (IOC) required Brazil to place higher than thirtieth in the FIH World Rankings by the end of 2014 or finish no worse than sixth at the 2015 Pan American Games in order to qualify as host nation. They achieved this by beating the United States on a penalty shoot-out in the quarterfinal, ensuring a top four finish. In addition to the six highest placed teams at the Semifinals of the 2014–15 FIH Hockey World League not already qualified, the following twelve teams, shown with final pre-tournament rankings, will compete in this tournament.

Squads

Group stage
All times are local (UTC−3).

Group A

Group B

Knockout stage

Bracket

Quarter-finals

Semi-finals

Bronze medal match

Gold medal match

Final ranking

Goalscorers

References

External links
Field hockey at Rio2016.com

 
Men's tournament